Victoria Girls School, established by Queen Victoria, provides education in both Tamil and English languages. It's a centenary school provided with well-equipped lab facilities. The school is well known for its discipline.

It has been ranked in top ten schools in Tuticorin District.

References 

Girls' schools in Tamil Nadu
High schools and secondary schools in Tamil Nadu
Thoothukudi district